August Schmidhuber (8 May 1901 – 19 February 1947) was an SS-Brigadeführer who commanded two Waffen-SS divisions in occupied Yugoslavia and Albania during the latter stages of World War II who was executed by the post-war Yugoslav authorities for war crimes. The Waffen-SS was an armed branch of the German Nazi Party that served alongside but was never formally part of the Wehrmacht. At the post-war Nuremberg trials, the Waffen-SSof which Schmidhuber was a senior officerwas declared to be a criminal organisation due to its major involvement in war crimes and crimes against humanity.

During anti-partisan operations in Yugoslavia, under his direct orders, the 21st Waffen SS Division Skanderbeg committed numerous atrocities; the division also contributed to the Holocaust by participating in the roundup and deportation of most of the Jews from Kosovo. Schmidhuber was captured in May 1945,  he was tried and convicted as war criminal, he was executed in Belgrade on 19 February 1947.

Early career

August Schmidhuber was born in Augsburg, Bavaria, the son of a minor government official. After finishing basic military training in the Reichswehr in Ulm in 1919, he signed up for 12 years' military service on 5 May. He was initially assigned to the Schützen Regiment (rifle regiment) Number 42. From 16 June 1919 until the beginning of October, Schmidhuber served with the 9th Company of his regiment and then spent nearly a year in 3 company.

At the same time, beginning in May 1919 to mid-June, he also entered the ranks of the Freikorps, Major Franz Ritter von Epp. Schmidhuber then transferred to Gebirgs-Jäger-Regiment (mountain hunters) Number 19 and on 1 October 1922 was appointed to the rank of  Gefreiter (private). He remained in the regular German army until 4 May 1931, when he left as an Oberfeldwebel (sergeant major).

After leaving the army Schmidhuber worked as a brewer and became active in politics in Bavaria, joining the Bayerische Volkspartei (Bavarian People's Party). During the presidential elections, he stood for the district of Lindau but did not win. He then joined the NSDAP and on 16 July 1933 entered into the SA. In the SA he was part of the SA Gruppe Hochland and served first as the deputy director of SA schools in the region, and then later also as a director. Schmidhuber was a member of the training command of the SA.

SS career

In May 1935 Schmidhuber joined the SS where he was appointed SS Obersturmführer and immediately  attached to the SS-Verfügungstruppe. Initially he commanded the 7th platoon of SS-1 Standarte and commanded troops there until early February 1936, when he was transferred to the SS Germania Regiment. There he led the 1st Company until 1 May 1936. On 13 September 1936 Schmidhuber was promoted to SS Hauptsturmführer and transferred to the regimental staff of SS Germania. He remained there until mid-November 1937, where the company was responsible for training noncommissioned officers, until the end of February 1938.

On 30 January 1939 Schmidhuber was promoted to the rank of SS Sturmbannführer. From 1 May to 1 November 1939, Schmidhuber was put in command of the 1st Battalion of SS Germania, while it took part in the invasion of Poland, he held this command until the end of 1940. On 21 June 1941 he was promoted to SS Obersturmbannführer and a year later he became regimental commander in the 7th SS Volunteer Mountain Division Prinz Eugen.  On 20 April 1943 Schmidhuber was promoted to SS Standartenführer (Colonel). From 28 November to late December 1943, then from 11 January to early February 1944 he temporarily held the command of Division Prinz Eugen.

On 17 April 1944 Schmidhuber became commander of the 21st Waffen Mountain Division of the SS Skanderbeg (1st Albanian), a volunteer force of ethnic Albanians under German command, which operated principally in the region of Kosovo. The division became notorious for its looting and atrocities against unarmed civilians, especially ethnic Serbs. In May 1944 the SS Skanderbeg contributed to the Holocaust when it took part in the roundup and deportation of Jews from Kosovo to the Bergen-Belsen concentration camp where almost all of them perished. On 21 June 1944 Schmidhuber was promoted to SS Oberführer. With regard to his anti-partisan activities in Kosovo during the war, the scholar Bernd Jürgen Fischer noted that Schmidhuber issued orders to "increase the burning of villages and killing of people, in keeping with these orders, between 19 September and 23 October, 131 NLM prisoners including women . . . were shot or hanged in Kosovo". The division also use retributive hangings as a response to acts of sabotage.
After six months in existence, following mass desertions within its ranks, poor combat record and history of atrocities, the division was ordered disbanded on 1 November 1944 by Heinrich Himmler. Schmidhuber blamed the divisions failure on the Albanian soldier stating that "during the attack he goes only as far as he finds something to steal or sack".

Schmidhuber became Brigadeführer und Generalmajor der Waffen-SS in January 1945. Following the German evacuation of Albania, on 21 January 1945 Schmidhuber replaced SS-Brigadeführer Otto Kumm as commander of the 7th SS Volunteer Mountain Division Prinz Eugen.  The German cadres of the 21st division (Reichsdeutsche and Volksdeutsche) were absorbed into the SS-Freiwilligen Gebirgsjäger Regiment 14 of Prinz Eugen which was given the honorific name Skanderbeg in memory of its sister formation, most of the Albanian Muslims were released from service. While Schmidhuber was in command and Prinz Eugen was deployed in Dalmatia, the unit committed multiple war crimes in Split and Dubrovnik. Division Prinz Eugen fought rearguards actions against Yugoslav partisans and Russians units as part of Army Group F while the Germans were in full retreat out of the country.

Capture and death
Schmidthuber was captured by the Red Army after Division Prinz Eugen surrendered at Cilli Slovenia on 11 May 1945, he was turned over to Yugoslav authorities.
A Yugoslav military tribunal  tried him on charges of participating in massacres, deportations, and atrocities against civilians and sentenced him to death by hanging. Schmidhuber was executed on 19 February 1947 in Belgrade.

Decorations and awards
German cross in gold on August 3, 1943
Iron Cross (1939) 2nd and 1st class on October 4 and November 11, 1939

See also
 List SS-Brigadeführer

Notes

References

Bibliography
 
 
 
 
 
 
 
 History of the United Nations War Crimes Commission and the Development of the Laws of War p. 528, United Nations War Crimes Commission, London: HMSO, 1948
 
 
 
 
 
 

1901 births
1947 deaths
Military personnel from Augsburg
SS-Brigadeführer
Holocaust perpetrators in Yugoslavia
Nazis executed by Yugoslavia by hanging
People from the Kingdom of Bavaria
Recipients of the Gold German Cross
Nazis convicted of war crimes
Executed people from Bavaria
Reichswehr personnel
20th-century Freikorps personnel
Waffen-SS personnel
Executed mass murderers